The EMC E3 is a , A1A-A1A passenger train locomotive that was manufactured by Electro-Motive Corporation of La Grange, Illinois. The EMC demonstrator #822 was released from La Grange for test on September 12, 1938. The cab version, or E3A, was manufactured from September 1938 to June 1940, and 17 were produced. The booster version, or E3B, was manufactured in March 1939 and September 1939, and 2 were produced. The  was achieved by putting two , 12-cylinder, model 567 engines in the engine compartment. Each engine drove its own electrical generator to power the traction motors. The E3 was the fourth model in a long line of passenger diesels of similar design known as EMD E-units.

Compared with passenger locomotives made later by EMD, the noses of the E3, E4, E5, and E6 cab units had pronounced slants when viewed from the side. Therefore, these four models have been nicknamed "slant nose" units. Later E models had the more vertical "bulldog nose" of the F series.  E3 demonstrator 822 was built with a nose identical to earlier EA and E1A units, but later locomotives in the series featured an elevated headlamp mounted in a nacelle, distinct from the flush profile mounting of the earlier units.  822 was modified in a similar fashion prior to delivery to the Kansas City Southern Railway.

Engine and powertrain
The E3 introduced a 12-cylinder version of the 567 series Diesel engine, with two being used for a total of 2,000 hp at 800 rpm. Earlier E-units had used two Winton 201A prime movers, but that engine was ill-suited to railroad use and was unreliable. The 567, which was specifically designed for railroad motive power applications, is a mechanically-aspirated, two-stroke 45-degree V-type with  displacement per cylinder, and remained in production until 1966. Two direct current generators, one per engine, provide power to four traction motors, two on each truck, in an A1A-A1A arrangement. This truck design was used on all E-units and on MP 7100, CB&Q 9908, and Rock Island EB6 power cars. EMC/EMD has built all of its major components since 1939.

Original owners

A units

B units

Surviving example
The only remaining E3 is ex-Atlantic Coast Line Railroad E3A #501. It was formerly owned by the late Glen Monhart, and operated on excursions in Wisconsin. Today, it is owned by the North Carolina Dept. of Transportation Rail Division, and is on long term loan to the North Carolina Transportation Museum, in Spencer, North Carolina. It is stored in operating condition, and will be run occasionally. In January 2013, NCDOT transferred ownership of the engine to the NC Department of Cultural Resources, Spencer Shops parent organization.

See also 

List of GM-EMD locomotives

References

Bibliography

External links

 North Carolina Transportation Museum

Diesel-electric locomotives of the United States
A1A-A1A locomotives
E3
Passenger locomotives
Railway locomotives introduced in 1939
Locomotives with cabless variants
Standard gauge locomotives of the United States
Streamlined diesel locomotives